, commonly nicknamed , is a fictional character and the protagonist of the manga and anime series Reborn! created by Akira Amano. In the story, Tsuna is one of the long lines of descendants from the Vongola family, a mafia that exists in Italy. He is the one who is to be the next leader of the Vongola, the tenth Vongola boss. To set him up to that position, hitman Reborn becomes his home tutor and trains him to be a suitable boss. With Reborn's help, Tsuna confronts his fears and befriends several people, some of which become his guardians within the Vongola Family. However, due to Tsuna's high position in the Mafia, various other families conspire to kill Tsuna, which forces him and his friends to stand up to their enemies. Besides the manga and the anime, Tsuna has also been featured in all of the video games from the series, light novels, and a CD soundtrack.

Tsuna's character has been very popular within readers from the manga; he appeared several times in the top 5 from the popularity polls developed for the series and has taken first place a few times. He has also been featured in merchandise from the series, such as figurines and plush. Publications for manga, anime and other media have commented on Tsuna's character, adding praise and criticism. Although Tsuna's story was initially considered very simple, writers from various websites have liked Tsuna's traits as well as his growth throughout the manga.

Character outline

Personality
Tsuna is a junior-high student who becomes the Vongola Family's mafia boss-in-training. The reason Tsuna was recruited is because of his father, Sawada Iemitsu, the external advisor of Vongola. Only ones with the Vongola bloodline are able to become boss. Also, the other candidates in line for the position of the head of the Vongola Family had died. He is normally insecure, considering himself a loser. He has a crush on a girl from his school, Kyoko Sasagawa, seeing her as the only reason to go to school.

When Reborn shoots him with the Vongola Family's Dying Will Bullet he comes back as a powerful wielding berserker whose goal is to act on what he had regretted to make it right whenever shot by this special bullet. However, if he does not regret anything when shot, he will die. Ironically, Tsuna's friends tend to remain amazed by Tsuna's actions in such mode, causing several people to be interested in his skills. He also manages to befriend Kyoko, which makes him very happy. Tsuna finds himself thrust into the mob life that is his future and begins to meet not only his friends and future family members but also the challenges that his new life holds.

Although Tsuna is the tenth generation Vongola boss, Tsuna is unwilling to take part in anything that has to do with the Mafia. He always denies the fact that he is a future Mafia boss and tries to avoid anyone involved with the Mafia. In the Vongola Test, he states that he would rather destroy the Vongola family than accept its history of violence and cruelty. Tsuna is often surprised and horrified at Reborn's and other mafiosi's actions. Later, even though he still wants nothing to do with the Mafia, he is grateful for the friends he has made since meeting Reborn. He cares for his new 'family' and would put himself in the way of danger in order to protect them. Though sometimes, Tsuna just finds himself wishing that he had never met any of them due to the weird looks they get whenever someone (mainly Gokudera who likes to have one-sided arguments with Yamamoto daily in school) decides to wreak havoc everywhere (especially Hibari who just loves biting random people to death). In the Inheritance Arc, due to the wanting to protect his comrades, his pride is to be able to protect his friends.

Abilities
The Dying Will Bullet increases his powers to make a task that he regrets to do before  he is shot. In the series, Tsuna also uses variations of the Dying Will Bullet that allows him to create any object or to force his strength into any part of his body. When shot by the Rebuke Bullet or eating the pill, Tsuna's body limiters are removed, allowing him to take control of his body with the Dying Will Bullet effect. This is known as "Hyper Dying Will Mode".

It is made out of the same material as the Dying Will Bullets and can ignite Dying Will Flames, giving Tsuna the ability to use them as thrusters to fly. Because Tsuna is part of the Vongola bloodline, he has the ability called "Hyper Intuition" granting him greater insight than most. After passing the Vongola test, the gloves are changed to X-Gloves Version Vongola Ring which can also produce a new type of explosive flame. As Tsuna is unable to control the new flame he creates a new attack called "" to manipulate it. It utilizes the two different flames created by his V.R. X-Gloves, but Tsuna has problems to control it until Spanner gives him special contact lens to calculate the fire amount.

With this technique Tsuna can extinguish and freeze objects and flames of others. Tsuna also creates his own version of the Breakthrough called , which allows him to capture Dying Will Flame attacks and convert the energy to his own. In his fight against the Millefiore, Tsuna learns a new move called "Burning Axel" and obtains the Vongola Sky Box which contains the Box Animal, Sky Lion Version Vongola, a miniature lion nicknamed . Natsu is able to petrify flames by harmonizing with them and is able to transform into weapons belonging to the first Vongola boss. Mantello Di Vongola Primo (Mantle of Vongola Primo) which acts as a barrier that wraps around Tsuna like a cloak and Mitten Di Vongola Primo (loosely translated as "Primo's Glove"), where Tsuna can use the technique Big Bang Axle.

Tsuna received an upgrade from the metal craftsman Talbot.  This gave him the Ring of The Vongola Ver. 10.  This new form allows him to access higher level of flame output and increases the power of the original x burner with the attack having a 'face' which is similar to Natsu's in appearance. This attack is so powerful that it was able to destroy the black hole that Emna was trapped in. Another technique is the XX Burner. It is a modified X Burner, being twice as powerful since in this technique, both gloves shoot hard flames, while arm thrusters shoot soft flames that act as support.

Appearances

In Reborn!
Following several months of training with Reborn, Tsuna becomes the target of the Kokuyo gang's criminal agenda to destroy the Vongola. The leader Mukuro Rokudo lures Tsuna out into the open by attacking his friends and colleagues until Tsuna, by request of the 9th boss, defeats them. Tsuna succeeds in defeating Mukuro, using his newly acquired X Gloves. Some time later, Tsuna receives the Vongola Ring halves from Dino. and after receiving the "Ring of the Sky", Tsuna undergoes training yet again with Reborn for his oncoming battle against the Varia, who intend on making their boss, Xanxus, the next Vongola boss; Ultimately, Tsuna must battle Xanxus for the right to hold the Ring of the Sky. On the day of the battle, Tsuna's family take a 4-3 lead, but then Xanxus accuses Tsuna for the "assassination" of the 9th boss; all the while, the 9th boss is alive but concealed within an opponent from Tsuna. Eventually Tsuna and Xanxus engage in their Sky Battle. Tsuna eventually overpowers Xanxus, but Xanxus still manages to obtain all seven Vongola rings. However, Xanxus is rejected, not being of Vongola blood; so the victory is awarded to Tsuna.

Days after the battle with the Varia, Tsuna and Reborn are inexplicably transported 10 years into the future, where the Tsuna of that time is in a catatonic state and that the Vongola family is at war with the Millefiore Family.  After reuniting the six Vongola guardians, Tsuna attacks the Millefiore base along with Lal Mirch, Ryohei, Yamamoto and Gokudera. When Tsuna's group is discovered, Tsuna covers as a decoy and fights the Milliefiore member Spanner. Tsuna falls unconscious during the fight and is taken captive by Spanner who helps him perfect his X Burner technique. Spanner develops special contacts lenses which assists Tsuna with stabilizing the X Burner and uses it to the defeat the remaining soldiers from the Milliefiore member Irie Shoichi. However, Irie reveals to be a spy allied with Tsuna's future self to help the Vongola defeat the Milliefiore leader Byakuran. Therefore, Tsuna and his friends train to confront Byakuran and his Six Funeral Wreaths guardians. On the day of the battle, Tsuna is chosen to be one of the first combatants in the first game of "Choice", which they lose. Just then, Uni, an acquaintance of Reborn, appears, and Tsuna is tasked with protecting her from Byakuran until he goes to confront him. Once defeating Byakuran, Tsuna and his friends are sent back to their own time by Irie.

In the new "Inheritance Story Arc", Tsuna  makes friends with transfer students who turn out to be members of the Shimon Family, a small Mafia clan. Later, they attack him and his guardians as revenge for Vongola Primo apparently betraying their family's founder. The rings are destroyed but repaired. An old man, Talbot, uses the Vongola Primo's blood, Penalty, to give the rings an upgrade with only a 50-50 chance it'll work. Tsuna is able to 'reawaken' his ring, transforming it into a unique form called "The Ring of the Sky, Version X", a finger armor ring with a second smaller ring connected by a chain. Tsuna and co. arrive at the Shimon Family's island, ready to take on the challenge. He witnesses his Guardians take on the other Guardians of the Shimon family. Tsuna is then attacked by an enraged Enma, the boss of Shimon, after the Vongola wins three battles consecutively, and Tsuna is told that his father was in charge of the murder of Enma's family, leaving Tsuna in a brief catatonic state. His confidence and determination revived with Hibari's help and the revelation of the fifth key that showed Giotto never betrayed Cozart Shimon. After defeating and rescuing Enma from Daemon's manipulation, he and Enma confronts Daemon together who had obtained Mukuro's body.  Daemon reveals he was the one who killed Enma's family (disguised as Tsuna's father) and while he briefly gains the upper hand, Tsuna's ring combines with Enma's and allows him to defeat Daemon.

After this, Tsuna tries to return to his daily life with his friends at Namimori Middle. However, when Reborn starts having strange dreams of Checkerface, also known more mysteriously as "The Man in the Iron Hat", Tsuna and his fellow student Dino Cavallone are roped into being his representatives in the "Battle of the Rainbow". Joining their team are Yamamoto, Gokudera and Ryohei. Before the battles start, Byakuran flies to Tsuna's house and alights on his roof, offering an alliance with Team Uni. Tsuna accepts the offer reluctantly, still unsure of Byakuran's intentions, but willing to trust him because of his kindness towards Yamamoto.

The Battle of the Rainbow soon begins, throwing all the teams into a frenzy. In the first battle, Tsuna is beaten decisively by his father Iemitsu, who is also capable of using the Dying Will Flame. However, Reborn manages to negotiate an alliance with Iemitsu's team in time to save Tsuna's Boss watch from being destroyed. When the Reborn team meets up at a local diner, Tsuna is seen silently brooding on his overwhelming defeat. That night, he, Reborn and Gokudera sleep over at Yamamoto's house. The next day Tsuna catches up with Enma on the events of the battle and is shocked to learn that the whole Shimon family will be on Skull's team. After school, Team Reborn goes to the hideout of Team Uni, with whom they have previously allied themselves. Uni predicts that two teams will be defeated in the next conflict, which begins soon after her statement. Team Verde launches an attack on Team Uni and Team Reborn, destroying Zakuro's watch. Team Colonello is perched on a nearby cliff, with Colonello in his Non-Cursed form. He uses his fully released Maximum Rifle to successfully injure all enemy combatants, excepting their allies on Team Reborn. Tsuna is shocked by his father's ruthlessness and objects to his methods, saying that Team Uni is his ally. Upon hearing this, Iemitsu terminates his alliance with Team Reborn, but gives Team Reborn a chance to escape. Tsuna rejects this, and continues to fight alongside Team Uni. Colonello fires a second shot from his Maximum Rifle, this time including the members of Team Reborn in the attack. Tsuna warns his comrades to take cover, but the shot is too powerful for Tsuna to block himself, according to Byakuran. Uni asks for Tsuna to be protected, so Gamma attempts to fulfill her wish and Reborn scrambles to protect his team's Boss Watch, but Byakuran jumps over both of them to protect Tsuna from the shot. He is blown apart by the shot, allowing Tsuna to move to attack Team Colonello.  Reborn denounce his alliance with Tsuna's father and Tsuna battled him for the boss watch.  Reborn used his curse free time to teach Tsuna the real meaning of dying will.

In other media
Besides his appearance in the original manga series and its anime adaptation, Tsuna has also starred in other Reborn! works. He is featured in all of the Hidden Bullet light novels by Amano and Hideaki Koyasu, but with a minor role, as they are focused in other characters from the series. He additionally participated in all of the series' video games, in which he is playable in his Dying Will Mode and Hyper. He is also a playable character in Jump Super Stars and Jump Ultimate Stars where he is paired with Reborn. On January 8, 2008 Pony Canyon released a Character CD featuring both Tsuna and Reborn. It features various tracks and dialogue composed by both of their voice actors: Yukari Kokubun and Neeko. On November 6, 2013, Tsuna and Reborn were announced as playable characters in J-Stars Victory Vs..

Reception
Tsuna was well received within the Reborn! reader base, having ranked as the most popular hero in the second official Weekly Shonen Jump poll of the series, which was divided into heroes and villains. In other polls of the series, Tsuna ranked as the most popular male character, as well as the latest one in which fans selected the characters they would want to see in their future's self appearance. The Japanese music distributor Recochoku has made two annual survey of which anime characters that people would like to marry. Tsuna ranked sixth in the category "The Character I Want to Be My Groom" from the 2008 survey and seventh in the 2009 poll.

Several websites from manga, anime and other media have commented on Tsuna's character. In Manga Life's review of volume nine, the reviewers expressed gratification to the main character's [Tsuna] reform, with David Rasmussen now seeing Tsuna as a "cooler" character compared to how he was before. Erin Finnegan from Pop Culture Shock noted Tsuna to be a very popular character within female readers of the series due to his appearance and praised how entertaining are his comedy scenes. Carlo Santos from Anime News Network commented that Tsuna needs to do more important things in the first volume from the manga to make the series more interesting, such as relating more with the Mafia. However, he noted the "volatile chemistry" between Tsuna and Reborn to be very likely. Charles Tan from Comics Village noted the story of his character to be "simple" but liked how Tsuna is an "inept, bumbling kid" as well as he agreed with Santos that his relation with Reborn is very good.
Jarred Pine from Mania Entertainment found Tsuna's appearances in the start of the manga to be very common due to how he starts meeting new friends, rivals and gains confidence. He noted Tsuna's first skills caused by the Dying Will Bullet to be an attempt from Akira Amano to add new things to the story, but added that "it almost cheapens the experience." However, Ben Leary from the same site also found the Dying Will Bullets to be very repetitive, but added that "watching it happen is such a blast you still look forward to it even when you see it coming."

References

Anime and manga characters who can move at superhuman speeds
Anime and manga characters with superhuman strength
Child characters in anime and manga
Comics characters introduced in 2004
Fictional middle school students
Fictional characters with gravity abilities
Fictional characters with fire or heat abilities
Fictional characters with ice or cold abilities
Fictional Italian people
Fictional Japanese people in anime and manga
Fictional characters with superhuman durability or invulnerability
Fictional gangsters
Male characters in anime and manga
Teenage characters in anime and manga
Reborn! characters
Television characters introduced in 2004